Toni Jeričević (born July 17, 1983) is a businessman turned actor and TV host who appeared in American and Croatian theatre plays, commercials and national television productions. He is best known as a TV host of the prime time reality sports TV show My Dad Is Better Than Your Dad which was originally produced by Mark Burnett for the U.S. broadcasting network NBC and  later franchised to the top Croatian broadcasting television station in Croatia Nova TV. Currently, he lives in China and works for The Walt Disney Company.

Early life
He graduated from Ord High School in Ord, Nebraska, earning an athletic and academic scholarship for the Midwestern private university Midland University (Midland Lutheran College at a time). Jericevic graduated summa cum laude with a Bachelor's degree in Marketing and Management among top 20 students overall, also earning himself a prestigious Wall Street Journal Student Achievement Award.

Career
In 2007 Jericevic left a serious business position to live and work in Budapest, Hungary to become a TV host of the national phone-in television game show Nova Lova for Nova TV. After that time he was invited to audition for a grand project My Dad Is Better Than Your Dad and got the part as the leading TV host. During that time Jericevic appeared in a theatre play Tablica Dijeljenja directed by Ivan Leo Lemo in HNK Pula, and went back to hosting phone-in game shows until the beginning of 2010.

In 2012 Jericevic was cast as the main villain in the short movie Unexpected Delivery. He also appeared as criminal inspector in popular television series Ruža Vjetrova  on RTL.

Theatre
The Milan Tarot Show (2013), cabaret
All In The Timing (2011/02), comedy
Master Class of Maria Callas (2001/02), drama
Rhinoceros (2002/03), drama
You Can't Take It with You (2003/04), comedy
It's Just A Play (2004/05), comedy
One Thousand and One Nights (2006/07), drama
The Liar (2007), comedy
The Fish Tales (2007), comedy
The Division Table (2008/09), children play

Television
IKEA commercial - IKEA (2014), HRT, NovaTV, RTL
Glazbena Prskalica (2013), Mreža TV
Najbrzi Igrac (2012), OBN
Ruža Vjetrova (2012), RTL
My Dad Is Better Than Your Dad (2008), NovaTV
Nova Lova (2007–2009), NovaTV
Bitange i princeze (2005), episode #39, HRT2
Buđenje - Ožujsko pivo commercial (2006)Pazi zid (2008)MOL reklam (2009)Fear Factor (2007)

FilmUnexpected Delivery'' (2012), Your Film Festival

References

Croatian television presenters
1983 births
Living people
Croatian male film actors
Croatian male stage actors
Croatian male television actors
Croatian emigrants to the United States
Midland University alumni
Croatian men's basketball players
Actors from Zadar
Economy of Zadar
People from Ord, Nebraska